Woodspeen is a village in Berkshire, England, and part of the civil parish of Speen.

External links

Villages in Berkshire
West Berkshire District